The 2017 Diamond League was the eighth season of the annual series of outdoor track and field meetings, organised by the International Association of Athletics Federations (IAAF). It is the first to feature the new championship-style system in which overall event winners are determined only by the results of the final meet.

Changes

The Diamond League's format was completely overhauled for the 2017 edition. The Diamond Race system used in previous years, in which athletes accumulated points through the season with double points in the finals, was replaced with a championship-style format in which earlier meets act as qualifying meets for the finals; the top eight or twelve athletes, depending on the event, will qualify. The two final meetings are held at the end of the season in Zürich (Weltklasse) and Brussels (Memorial Van Damme), with half of the 32 events contested in each final; the overall Diamond League championship in each event will be determined solely by the results of the finals. While not previously used in the Diamond League, this new system is similar to the old IAAF Grand Prix circuit with its IAAF Grand Prix Final.

Scoring in the non-final meets was extended from the top six to the top eight, with the winner receiving eight points and the runner-up seven, down to one point for an eighth-place finish. Instead of all 32 events appearing in six meets and the final, half of the events now appear in only four qualifying meets in addition to the final; the remaining events are still contested in six qualifying meets and the final. A controversial field event rule change from 2016, under which only the top four athletes after three rounds were allowed the full six attempts, was reverted for 2017.

Disciplines

Points system

A new points system was adopted for the 2017 Diamond League, with the winner of an event at a qualifying meet receiving eight points and the runner-up seven, down to one point for the athlete in eighth place; at the end of the year, the eight or twelve athletes with the most points, depending on the event, will qualify for the finals. In case of a tie on points, the best legal mark during the qualifying phase will determine the athlete who qualifies.

Schedule
The following fourteen meetings are scheduled to be included in the 2017 season:

Season overview
 Events held at Diamond League meets, but not included in the Diamond League points race, are marked in grey background.
 Diamond league final winners are marked with light blue background.

Men

Track

Field

Women

Track

Field

Diamond League Finals

Men

100 metres

Qualification

Top 8 qualified as of right.

Athletes marked with * called up as reserves for Final

Final

200 metres

Qualification

Top 8 qualified as of right.

Athletes marked with * called up as reserves for Final

Final

400 metres

Qualification

Top 8 qualified as of right.

Athletes marked with * called up as reserves for Final

Final

800 metres

Qualification

Top 8 qualified as of right.

Athletes marked with * called up as reserves for Final

Final

1500 metres

Qualification

Top 12 qualified as of right.

Athletes marked with * called up as reserves for Final

Final

5000 metres

Qualification

Top 12 qualified as of right.

Athletes marked with * called up as reserves for Final

Final

3000 metres steeplechase

Qualification

Top 12 qualified as of right.

Athletes marked with * called up as reserves for Final

Final

110 metres hurdles

Qualification

Top 8 qualified as of right.

Athletes marked with * called up as reserves for Final

Final

400 metres hurdles

Qualification

Top 8 qualified as of right.

Athletes marked with * called up as reserves for Final

Final

High Jump

Qualification

Top 12 qualified as of right.

Athletes marked with * called up as reserves for Final

Final

Pole Vault

Qualification

Top 12 qualified as of right.

Athletes marked with * called up as reserves for Final

Final

Long Jump

Qualification

Top 8 qualified as of right.

Athletes marked with * called up as reserves for Final

Final

Triple Jump

Qualification

Top 8 qualified as of right.

Athletes marked with * called up as reserves for Final

Final

Shot Put

Qualification

Final

Discus Throw

Qualification

Final

Javelin Throw

Qualification

Top 8 qualified as of right.

Athletes marked with * called up as reserves for Final

Final

Women

100 metres

Qualification

Top 8 qualified as of right.

Athletes marked with * called up as reserves for Final

Final

200 metres

Qualification

Top 8 qualified as of right.

Athletes marked with * called up as reserves for Final

Final

400 metres

Qualification

Top 8 qualified as of right.

Athletes marked with * called up as reserves for Final

Final

800 metres

Qualification

Top 8 qualified as of right.

Athletes marked with * called up as reserves for Final

Final

1500 metres

Qualification

Top 12 qualified as of right.

Athletes marked with * called up as reserves for Final

Final

5000 metres

Qualification

Top 12 qualified as of right.

Athletes marked with * called up as reserves for Final

Final

3000 metres steeplechase

Qualification

Top 12 qualified as of right.

Athletes marked with * called up as reserves for Final

Final

100 metres hurdles

Qualification

Top 8 qualified as of right.

Athletes marked with * called up as reserves for Final

Final

400 metres hurdles

Qualification

Top 8 qualified as of right.

Athletes marked with * called up as reserves for Final

Final

High Jump

Qualification

Top 12 qualified as of right.

Athletes marked with * called up as reserves for Final

Final

Pole Vault

Qualification

Top 12 qualified as of right.

Athletes marked with * called up as reserves for Final

Final

Long Jump

Qualification

Final

Triple Jump

Qualification

Top 8 qualified as of right.

Athletes marked with * called up as reserves for Final

Final

Shot put

Qualification

Top 8 qualified as of right.

Athletes marked with * called up as reserves for Final

Final

Discus Throw

Qualification

Final

Javelin Throw

Qualification

Top 8 qualified as of right.

Athletes marked with * called up as reserves for Final

Final

References

External links

Official website

Diamond League
Diamond League